San Camillo de Lellis is a church on Via Sallustiana, Rome, Italy. It is dedicated to Saint Camillus de Lellis (1550–1614).

It was built under Pope Pius X, with construction (under the architect Tullio Passarelli) commencing in 1906 and the first stone being laid by Cardinal Antonio Agliardi.  It was consecrated and made a parochial church in 1910, granted to the Chierici Regolari Ministri degli Infermi, the Priest Ministers of the Sick, the order founded by Camillus.  In 1965, Pope Paul VI elevated the church to the status of minor basilica and become the seat of cardinal's title of S. Camilli de Lellis ad Hortus Sallustianos. Juan Luis Cipriani Thorne has been the cardinal protector since 2001.

Architecture

Exterior
The façade, by Passarelli, is in the Neo-Gothic style of Lombardy. It is covered with red stone, with decorative elements in travertine. Before it is a large staircase. There are three doorways, each with a lunette with bas-relief above. Over the central one is Christ presenting Saint Camillus to the Sick, to the sides are Christ between Children and The Pardon of the Adulteress. Between the two stories is a gallery decorated with symbols of the Evangelists.

Adjacent to the church is the house of the Priest Ministers of the Sick.

Interior
The church has a Latin cross plan with three aisles divided by pillars that support arches. In a niche by the high altar is a statue of Saint Camillus by Alberto Galli, made in 1911.  There is a side altar dedicated to the Blessed Virgin.

Cardinal Protectors
Pope Paul VI established it as titular church on 25 May 1965.

 Paul Zoungrana, M.Afr. (25 May 1965 appointed-4 June 2000 died)
 Juan Luis Cipriani Thorne, (21 February 2001 appointed - present)

External links 
  Official website

Basilica churches in Rome
Christian organizations established in 1910
Titular churches
Churches completed in 1910
20th-century Roman Catholic church buildings in Italy
1910 establishments in Italy
Churches of Rome (rione Sallustiano)